is a body of water on the northern coast of the Nemuro Peninsula in Hokkaido, Japan.

Bays of Japan
Landforms of Hokkaido